Patricia Clark is an American poet and professor.

Life 
Patricia Clark was raised in Tacoma, Washington. She earned degrees in Creative Writing (M.F.A. Creative Writing, University of Montana) and English (PhD English, University of Houston). Her B.A. is economics (B.A. Economics, University of Washington).

Clark is poet-in-residence and professor in the Department of Writing at Grand Valley State University in Michigan. She is the author of six books of poetry.

The Poet Laureate of Grand Rapids, Michigan from 2005 to 2007, Clark was invited with two other poets to open the Library of Congress's noon reading series in Washington, D.C. in fall 2005.

Clark previously did residencies at the Virginia Center for the Creative Arts, the MacDowell Colony, and the Tyrone Guthrie Centre in Ireland.

Her work has appeared in The Atlantic, Slate, Poetry, North American Review, Barrow Street (magazine)  and Lake Effect (journal).

Sunday Rising received a positive review in Colorado Review.

Selected works

Books 
 Self-Portrait with a Million Dollars, poetry (Terrapin Books, 2020) 
The Canopy, poetry (Terrapin Books, 2017)
Sunday Rising, poetry (Michigan State University Press, 2013)
She Walks into the Sea, poetry (Michigan State University Press, 2009)
My Father on a Bicycle, poetry (Michigan State University Press, 2005)
North of Wondering, poetry (Michigan State University Press, 2003)

Chapbooks
Deadlifts (Michigan State Press, January 2018)  and 
Wreath for the Red Admiral(Lulu.com, June 2016)  and

References

External links

Living people
21st-century American poets
Chapbook writers
American women poets
1952 births
21st-century American women writers